Magliocco Canino is a red Italian wine grape variety that is predominantly grown in the Calabria region of southern Italy. It is often used as a blending grape, often with Gaglioppo of which the varieties are often confused. In the late 20th century there was just over 1500 ha (3700 acres) of Magliocco Canino planted.

Synonyms
Various synonyms have been used to describe Magliocco Canino and its wines, including Gaglioppo, Magliocco, Magliocco ovale and Magliuacculu.

References

Red wine grape varieties